Maksim Vasilyevich Korshunov (born 11 April 1993) is a Russian football midfielder. He plays for FC Novokuznetsk.

Club career
He made his debut in the Russian Football National League for FC Metallurg-Kuzbass Novokuznetsk on 28 August 2012 in a game against FC Volgar Astrakhan.

References

External links

1993 births
Living people
Russian footballers
Association football midfielders
FC Novokuznetsk players
FC Sakhalin Yuzhno-Sakhalinsk players